Lawrence Antony Collins, Baron Collins of Mapesbury  (born 7 May 1941) is a British judge and former Justice of the Supreme Court of the United Kingdom. He was also appointed to the Court of Final Appeal of Hong Kong on 11 April 2011 as a non-permanent judge from other common law jurisdictions. He was formerly a partner in the British law firm Herbert Smith. He is now a full time international arbitrator, Chair of Laws at UCL Faculty of Laws, and continues to sit as a member of the HKFCA.

Early life

Collins was born on 7 May 1941 and educated at the City of London School, and then at Downing College, Cambridge, graduating with a starred first in Law. He received an LL.M. degree from Columbia Law School in New York City and was admitted as a solicitor in 1968, becoming a partner at Herbert Smith in 1971 until his appointment as a judge in 2000. 

He served as head of the Litigation and Arbitration Department at Herbert Smith from 1995 to 1998. He and Arthur Marriott were the two first practising solicitors ever to be appointed Queen's Counsel, on 27 March 1997. 

As a solicitor-advocate, he appeared before the English Court of Appeal, the Judicial Committee of the House of Lords, and the European Court of Justice. He acted for the Government of Chile in the case to extradite General Pinochet.

Judiciary
In 1997, he was appointed a Deputy High Court Judge, becoming a full-time Judge in the Chancery Division on 28 September 2000, at which time he left Herbert Smith. He was the first solicitor to be appointed as a judge of the High Court direct from private practice, and only the second solicitor to be appointed, after Sir Michael Sachs in 1993, who had previously sat as a circuit judge for nine years. In a landmark case in 2006, he required file sharers who had refused to settle with the British Phonographic Industry to pay damages running into thousands of pounds.

His appointment as a Lord Justice of Appeal (judge of the Court of Appeal) was announced on 11 January 2007, and he was sworn to the Privy Council a month later. On 8 April 2009, it was announced that he would replace Lord Hoffmann (who retired on 20 April 2009) as a Lord of Appeal in Ordinary. He is the first solicitor to be appointed to these senior levels of the judiciary. Accordingly, on 21 April 2009, he was created Baron Collins of Mapesbury, of Hampstead Town in the London Borough of Camden, and was introduced in the House of Lords on 28 April 2009. On 1 October 2009, he and nine other Lords of Appeal became Justices of the Supreme Court upon that body's inauguration.

He has been a fellow of Wolfson College, Cambridge, since 1975, became a fellow of the British Academy in 1994, and Chair of Laws at UCL Faculty of Laws since 2011. He is a member of the Institut de droit international. He has been the general editor of Dicey & Morris, the standard reference work on conflict of laws, since 1987, and it was retitled Dicey, Morris and Collins in its 14th edition, published in 2006. He is also the author of many other books and articles on private international law. He became a bencher of the Inner Temple in 2001. Collins was previously an adjunct professor of law at NYU School of Law.

Collins reached the compulsory retirement age of 70 on 7 May 2011 but stayed on as an acting justice until July. He has continued membership of the House of Lords, and sits as a crossbencher.

Significant judgments
HJ and HT v Home Secretary [2010] UKSC 31: homosexuality in asylum claims
R v Bentley (Derek) [1999] posthumous overturning of unsafe murder conviction

Family
He has one daughter, Hannah, and one son, Aaron.

References

External links
 from Downing College

1941 births
Living people
Alumni of Downing College, Cambridge
British legal scholars
Chancery Division judges
Columbia Law School alumni
Conflict of laws scholars
Crossbench life peers
21st-century English judges
20th-century English judges
Fellows of Downing College, Cambridge
Fellows of the British Academy
Fellows of Wolfson College, Cambridge
Hong Kong judges
Judges of the Supreme Court of the United Kingdom
Justices of the Court of Final Appeal (Hong Kong)
Knights Bachelor
Law lords
Lords Justices of Appeal
Members of the Inner Temple
Members of the Institut de Droit International
Members of the Judicial Committee of the Privy Council
Members of the Privy Council of the United Kingdom
People educated at the City of London School